Guoqi Zhang from the Philips Research/Delft University of Technology, Delft, The Netherlands was named Fellow of the Institute of Electrical and Electronics Engineers (IEEE) in 2014 for contributions to heterogeneous micro/nano electronics packaging, system integration and reliability.

References

Fellow Members of the IEEE
Living people
Year of birth missing (living people)
Place of birth missing (living people)
Academic staff of the Delft University of Technology